The following buildings and structures were added to the National Register of Historic Places as part of the Archeological Resources of the 18th-Century Smyrnea Settlement of Dr. Andrew Turnbull MPS (or MPS).

References

 Arch
National Register of Historic Places Multiple Property Submissions in Florida
Buildings and structures in New Smyrna Beach, Florida